Damodaran Devanand (born 31 July 1972) is a first-class cricketer who played for Tamil Nadu in the Ranji Trophy. He was born in Ranipettai, Tamil Nadu, India.

Damodaran is a right-hand batsman and Right-arm Medium bowler. He took a hat-trick in the 2001-02 Ranji Trophy playing for Tamil Nadu against Orissa.

Teams
Ranji Trophy: Tamil Nadu

See also
 List of hat-tricks in the Ranji Trophy

References

Tamil Nadu cricketers
People from Vellore district
Living people
1972 births